The Hollyford River / Whakatipu Kā Tuka is in the southwest of the South Island of New Zealand. It runs for  through Fiordland, its sources being close to the Homer Tunnel and in Gertrude Valley in the southern Darran Mountains. 

At first, the river flows southeast and east, coming as close as 1km to the east-west divide of the South Island, before continuing north through the glacier-formed Hollyford Valley.

The Hollyford Track follows the river's course. Part of the river's course is traditionally regarded as the boundary between the Southland and Otago regions, however, current maps show the entirety of the Hollyford Valley contained within the Southland Region.

In January 1863 Patrick Quirk Caples explored the river, naming it after his home town of Hollyford, County Tipperary in Ireland. Following the passage of the Ngai Tahu Claims Settlement Act 1998, the name of the river was officially altered to Hollyford River / Whakatipu Kā Tuka.

Three sections of the river are regularly travelled by kayak:

Monkey Creek - Falls Creek: Grade: V+ 
Falls Creek - Marian Swingbridge: Grade: III - IV 
Marian Creek Run: Grade: IV - V

References

External links

Hollyford Valley at the Department of Conservation

Rivers of Fiordland